The Bayonne - Saint-Jean-Pied-de-Port railway is a French 52-kilometre long railway line, that connects the Bayonne to Saint-Jean-Pied-de-Port, running through the foothills of the Pyrenees. The railway was opened fully in 1898.

Route

The Bayonne - Saint-Jean-Pied-de-Port railway leaves the Bayonne station in a southerly direction. It crosses the river Adour south of Bayonne town centre, and then splits with the Toulouse-Bayonne railway and Bordeaux-Irun railway. It continues through valleys within the Pyrenees until it reaches Saint-Jean-Pied-de-Port station, its south-eastern terminus.

History
The line opened in 3 sections between 1891 and 1898 as follows:

 Bayonne - Cambo-les-Bains on 19 January 1891
 Cambo-les-Bains - Ossès on 20 August 1892
 Ossès - Saint-Jean-Pied-de-Port on 11 December 1898

As of 2014 no trains run south from Cambo-les-Bains and a rail replacement bus service is used from this station onwards to SJPP. The rails are rusty and there are weeds growing up between the crossties. The line hugs a river valley and in places is only 20 feet above the Nive river. At one point, where the line crosses the river on a truss bridge, the ballast has been washed away over a distance of about 30 feet and the rail and crossties are suspended in mid-air. There is a collection of driftwood at this point; evidence of flood damage (probably at this location: 43.256303, -1.320315).

The line was reopened on November 22nd 2015.

Services

The Bayonne - Saint-Jean-Pied-de-Port railway is used by the following passenger services:
TER Nouvelle-Aquitaine regional services between Bayonne and Saint-Jean-Pied-de-Port

References

Railway lines in Nouvelle-Aquitaine
Railway lines opened in 1898
Standard gauge railways in France